The Constitutional Court of the Czech Republic is a specialized type of court which primarily works to protect the people in the Czech Republic against violations of the Constitution by either the legislature, government or by any other subject that violates people's constitutional rights and freedoms. In this respect, it is similar in functionality to the Supreme Court of the United States, but is distinct from the Supreme Court of the Czech Republic. Of all the various levels of the Czech Judiciary it is the one created with the greatest specificity in the constitution.

The decisions of the Court are final, cannot be overturned and are considered a source of law, similar to precedents in a common law system.

Although the Court itself was established only in 1993, its Czechoslovak predecessor was already provided for in the Constitution of 1920, making Czechoslovakia the first country in the world with a system of judicial review by a specialized court (although the court itself first convened after the Austrian one). It was later adopted by many other countries.

History and predecessors

1848–1918 
The development of the Czech constitutional tradition went initially hand in hand with that in Austria-Hungary, to which the Czech Crown lands belonged between 1806–1918. The first attempts to establish a system based on constitution were connected with the 1848 Revolution. A number of constitutions were enacted during the Austrian period (April 1848, March 1849, February 1861 all enacted by the king, December 1867 enacted by the Parliament), however these were far from being democratic and did not include the possibility of judicial review of the acts of the Parliament nor the Habsburg sovereigns. Although the attempt to democratize the Habsburg monarchy failed at the time, it marked the beginning of Czech political activization which ultimately brought about personalities such as Karel Kramář or Tomáš Masaryk, who later took part in the establishment of the First Czechoslovak Republic and its constitutional tradition.

1918–1948 
Following the establishment of Czechoslovakia, the Interim Constitution was passed in November 1918 (Act No. 37/1918 Coll.), which did not yet establish the Constitutional court.

Meanwhile, the works on the Czechoslovak constitution were at full pace. The new constitution was influenced by the following models:
 1867 Austrian constitution in the sphere of civil rights,
 1787 constitution of the USA in the sphere of judiciary and checks and balances,
 1875 French constitution in the sphere of the powers of the president and the parliament,
 the Swiss constitution in the sphere of the powers of the government.
The new constitution was further influenced by the Czech humanist tradition (Jan Hus, Petr Chelčický, Jan Amos Komenský, František Palacký, František Rieger, Tomáš Masaryk) as well as the peace conferences which took place after the first world war.

The new constitution was accepted on 2 February 1920 as Act No. 121/1920 Coll. With this constitution Czechoslovakia became the first country in the world to adopt a system where a review of acts of the national parliament's constitutionality was possible by a special court - the Constitutional Court (while in USA and Australia this power was vested in the hands of their Supreme Courts already before and the Austrian Constitutional Court already had the power to examine laws of the States of Austria in 1919). Later, a similar system of judicial review on national level was adopted by Austria (1920) which came into force before the Czechoslovak Constitutional Court took up its duties. It later became generally known as the Austrian System, being taken over by many other countries e.g. Liechtenstein (1925), Greece (1927), Spain (1931), Germany (1949) etc. The Constitutional Court of Czechoslovakia itself came into existence in the assembly hall of the presidium of the Council of Ministers at Prague Castle on 17 November 1921.

The Constitutional Court had the jurisdiction to decide about constitutionality of the enactments of the Republic, of Assembly of the Carpathian Ruthenia (this was only theoretical, as the presumption of its autonomy was not reached until 1938) and of legal measures of Permanent Committee (which consisted of 16 members of the Chamber of the Deputies and 8 Senators and took action in urgent cases when the Parliament was not in session). The motions for review of enactments could be brought by the Supreme Court, Supreme Administrative Court, Chamber of Deputies, Senate and the Assembly of the Carpathian Ruthenia, while the legal measures of the Permanent Committee were subject to automatic review immediately after being passed. Unlike today, the Court did not have the jurisdiction to hear citizens' individual petitions.

The Court was active in the period of 1921–1931, when it reviewed a number of legal measures of the Permanent Committee, however no motions for review of enactments were ever brought before it. Although the legal basis for the Court and its jurisdiction remained unchanged, it was vacant and inactive between 1932–1937. The Chief Justice for the period of 1938-1939 was Jaroslav Krejčí.

Although the Constitution remained in force during the German Nazi occupation and after the war, the rights it was providing for became only theoretical and the Constitutional Court had not convened during and after the second world war.

1948–1989 
Due to extermination of a large number of Czechoslovakian elites by the Nazi Germans, disillusion with the Western countries following the Munich Agreement and high influence of the Soviet Union, which liberated almost whole of the country, the post-war era may be characterized by the growing influence of the communists, which culminated in February 1948 Communist coup. A new constitution was adopted in May 1948. It was essentially a 1920 constitution modified by socialist ideas in order to serve the ideology of the communist party. For example, the list of fundamental rights was extended to cover also social and cultural rights, but on the other hand the right of a private ownership was limited. Formally, the constitution was democratic and influenced by the idea of "People's Democracy". In reality, however, democracy was curbed with the communist party controlling the state and the fundamental rights not being observed by the authorities.

The 1948 constitution did not adopt the Constitutional Court.

Another constitution was adopted in 1960, being influenced mostly by the Soviet constitution of 1936. It legally established the "leading role" of the communist party, declared Marxism-Leninism as the state's leading ideology, removed the division of power. This constitution was to a large degree modified in 1968, establishing Czech and Slovak Socialist Republics within the Czechoslovakia as a federative socialist state. The 1968 constitution re-introduced the Constitutional Court, or in fact three of them - one for the Federation and two for the Republics. The Federal Constitutional Court was to have a jurisdiction over constitutionality of federal enactments and disputes over competencies between the Federation and the Republics. The Constitution anticipated adoption of an enactment dealing in detail with Constitutional Court, but that did not happen until 1991, precluding the factual establishment of the Court. Officially the need for the Court had not arisen as the presumed disputes over competencies between the Federation and the Republics never took place.

1989–1992 
The first changes to the Constitution took place already during the Velvet Revolution. On 30 November 1989, the leading role of the communist party was abolished as well as mentioning of the Marxism-Leninism. A number of other novelizations led to democratization of the constitution. In 1991 the Charter of Fundamental Rights was adopted as a part of the Constitutional order, which was followed by an implementing enactment dealing with the Constitutional Court, as presumed by the 1968 constitution.

The Constitutional Court of Czechoslovakia was thus re-established, although only for a brief period of time in 1992 before the dissolution of Czechoslovakia. The dissolution itself was actually carried out by a constitutional act (No. 542/1992 Coll.).

Since 1992 
On 16 December 1992 a new Constitution (Act No. 1/1993 Coll.) and the Charter of Fundamental Rights and Basic Freedoms (Act No. 2/1993 Coll.) were adopted. Article 83-89 of the Constitution established the Constitutional Court of the Czech Republic, the processes of which are further elaborated in Act No. 182/1993 Coll..

Jurisdiction 

The major part of the court's workload consists of individual petitions of citizen's alleged violations of their constitutional rights after all other remedies were exhausted (including appeals to the Supreme Court or the Supreme Administrative Court).

According to Article 87 of the Constitution, the Constitutional Court shall rule on:
 repeal of laws or individual provisions thereof should they contravene the constitutional order,
 repeal of other legal regulations or individual provisions thereof should they contravene the constitutional order or the law,
 constitutional complaints filed by territorial self-government bodies against illegal interventions by the State,
 constitutional complaints filed against final decisions and other interventions by agencies of public authority, violating constitutionally guaranteed fundamental rights and freedoms,
 appeals against decisions in matters of confirmation of the election of a Deputy or Senator,
 reservations on loss of eligibility and on incompatibility of holding the office of Deputy or Senator according to Article 25,
 impeachment by the Senate of the President of the Republic under Article 65, par. 2,
 the Presidential proposal to repeal a decision of the Chamber of Deputies and the Senate according to Article 66 (decision on execution of selected presidential duties being handed over to the Prime Minister in case of President's inability to execute them himself for a serious reason),
 measures essential for the implementation of a ruling by an international court, which is binding for the Czech Republic, unless it can be implemented in a different manner,
 whether a decision on the dissolution of a political party, or another decision regarding the activity of a political party, conforms to constitutional or other laws,
 disputes regarding the scope of the jurisdiction of state agencies and territorial self-government agencies, unless such disputes are under the jurisdiction of a different body,
 on the remedy against a decision adopted by the President of the Republic not to announce a referendum concerning the accession of the Czech Republic to the European Union, on whether the procedure of the referendum concerning the accession of the Czech Republic to the European Union is in accordance with the Constitutional Act on Referendum concerning the Accession of the Czech Republic to the European Union and the implementing regulation related thereto.

Also, in cases when an already abolished law contrary to the constitutional order should be applied by a general court, it shall submit the issue to the Constitutional Court (Art. 95 par. 2).

Composition 
The Court is composed of 15 justices who are named for a renewable period of 10 years by the President subject to the Senate's approval. The justices enjoy criminal immunity and may be prosecuted only subject to the approval of the Senate.

The plenum of the court is quorate when at least 10 justices are present. A majority of at least 9 justices must be reached in order to repeal a law, to impeach the President or to adopt a legal opinion differentiating from one previously held. Other matters are decided by senates consisting of three justices.

See also

Judiciary
Rule of law
Rule according to higher law

References 

1993 establishments in the Czech Republic
Government of the Czech Republic
Law of the Czech Republic
Czech Republic
Judiciary of the Czech Republic